Prignano may refer to:

Prignano Cilento,  Italian municipality of the province of Salerno
Prignano sulla Secchia, Italian municipality of the province of Modena
Bartolomeo Prignano, the name at birth of Pope Urban VI.